The southern three-striped opossum (Monodelphis theresa) is an opossum species from South America. It is found in the Atlantic Forest region of Brazil.

References

Opossums
Endemic fauna of Brazil
Fauna of the Atlantic Forest
Marsupials of South America
Mammals of Brazil
Mammals described in 1921
Taxa named by Oldfield Thomas
Taxobox binomials not recognized by IUCN